TrueMoney is a financial technology brand, providing e-payment services in Southeast Asia. In Thailand, the platform includes TrueMoney Wallet, WeCard by MasterCard, TrueMoney Cash Card, Kiosk, Express, Payment Gateway and Remittance.

History
TrueMoney was founded in 2003 as part of True Corporation but now reorganized under Ascend Group in 2014, a spin-off of True Corporation and a subsidiary of Charoen Pokphand Group.

TrueMoney features a remittance service, and has initiated cross-border remittance from Myanmar and Cambodia, to Thailand.

Products
 Payment gateway
 Stored value card
 Electronic bill payment
 Cash on delivery
 Controlled payment number

Regional expansion
TrueMoney has offices in Thailand, Vietnam, Cambodia, Myanmar, Indonesia and the Philippines. TrueMoney has licenses to operate e-money in almost every Southeast Asian country. As the flagship venture, Thailand's TrueMoney counts Google and Alipay as partner payment platforms.

See also
 PayPal
 Paysbuy

References

Companies based in Bangkok
Charoen Pokphand
Ascend Group
True Corporation
Online payments
Financial services companies of Thailand
Thai brands